The 2014 The Citadel Bulldogs football team represented The Citadel, The Military College of South Carolina in the 2014 NCAA Division I FCS football season. The Bulldogs were led by first-year head coach Mike Houston and played their home games at Johnson Hagood Stadium. They played as members of the Southern Conference, as they have since 1936. They finished the season 5–7, 3–4 in SoCon play to finish in fifth place.

Schedule
For the fifth year in a row, home games in September were scheduled for a 6:00 p.m. kickoff rather than the traditional 2:00 p.m. kickoff.

Game summaries

Coastal Carolina

Florida State

Charleston Southern

Gardner–Webb

Wofford

Charlotte

Chattanooga

Western Carolina

Mercer

Furman

Samford

VMI

References

Citadel
The Citadel Bulldogs football seasons
The Citadel Bulldogs f